The Radio Gaúcha AM Guaíba Mast (also known as IPÊ Mast or as Antena do Parque Técnico Maurício Sirotsky Sobrinho) is the tallest man-made object in Brazil. The Radio Gaúcha AM Guaíba Mast is used by Radio Gaúcha for medium-wave broadcasting on 600 kHz with 100 kW. It is a 230-metre (755 ft.) tall, ground-insulated guyed mast radiator. The Radio Gaúcha AM Guaíba Mast was built in 1985/1986 to improve the transmissions of football matches.

It is an almost exact replica of the Warsaw Radio Mast, although it is not nearly as high as the Warsaw Radio Mast.

References

Towers in Brazil
Buildings and structures in Rio Grande do Sul